Girón Canton is a canton of Ecuador, located in the Azuay Province.  Its capital is the town of Girón.  Its population at the 2001 census was 12,583	.

Demographics
Ethnic groups as of the Ecuadorian census of 2010:
Mestizo  94.7%
White  2.9%
Afro-Ecuadorian  1.5%
Indigenous  0.6%
Montubio  0.3%
Other  0.1%

References

Cantons of Azuay Province